A winged wheel is a symbol used historically on monuments by the Ancient Greeks and Romans and more recently as a heraldic charge.  The symbol was associated with the Ancient Greek god Hermes and as a representation of the chariot (or velocipede) of Triptolemus.  In heraldry the symbol has been used to represent transport, speed and progress.  A three-winged wheel was chosen as the logo of the British Cyclists' Touring Club and at one point was considered "cycling’s most famous symbol".  A two-winged version formed the logo of the London General Omnibus Company and, after a merger, formed the  basis of the modern London Underground roundel.

History 

The symbol is considered to be distinct from the older winged circle symbol which was commonly used in Mesopotamian and Assyrian symbolism.  It was used by the ancient Greeks as a symbol of Hermes, the herald of the Gods, but despite this it is relatively rare on surviving Greek and Roman monuments.  When it does appear it is mainly as an abbreviation or indication of a chariot or to symbolise motion.  The winged wheel is often used to represent the fabled chariot or velocipede of the Greek god Triptolemus.

Use in heraldry 
The winged wheel is used in heraldry, though plain wheels (usually cart wheels) and mill wheels are also used.  However, the Catherine wheel torture device is the most common wheel symbol used in heraldry.  The winged wheel has been shown with one, two or three wings.

When included in heraldric arms they are often emblems of engineering or transport; for example in the arms of the Institution of Municipal Engineers.  However other meanings have included representing railroads, steam power, tourism, speed and progress.  The device has also been used to represent the Holy Spirit of the Abrahamic religions.

A two-winged wheel was the logo of the London General Omnibus Company. When this company was merged into Underground Electric Railways Company of London (UERL) in 1912 the logo was combined with the "disc and bar" of the UERL to form the basis of the modern London Underground roundel.  A triple-winged wheel was adopted as the logo of the Cyclists' Touring Club (CTC) in 1886, possibly taking inspiration from earlier logos of the League of American Wheelmen and the Swift Cycling Club.  The CTC logo quickly became "cycling’s most famous symbol", featuring on the outside of hotels  associated with the CTC (known as "wheel houses") across the United Kingdom.

A winged wheel symbol has been used in other contexts as various as the coat of arms of Panama and of the city of Edmonton in Canada, the flag of Knoxville, Tennessee, the badge of the Ohio State Highway Patrol, the collar badge of Polish railway troops, the emblem of Russian Railway Troops, and the logo of Rotary Watches.

The Detroit Red Wings ice hockey team has used a winged wheel in its logo since 1933, when it adopted its current name. Owner James E. Norris drew inspiration for the logo from the Montreal Amateur Athletic Association, whose athletes wore a similar design.

In addition to his associations with movement and swiftness Hermes has medical associations (for example through his Caduceus staff).  This led to the winged wheel's adoption by the US Army's 2nd Surgical Hospital, where it represented the unit's role in evacuating the wounded.

See also
 Winged sun

References 

Heraldic charges
Symbols of Abrahamic religions